Sulop, officially the Municipality of Sulop, is a 3rd class municipality in the province of Davao del Sur, Philippines. According to the 2020 census, it has a population of 35,151 people.

History

The name Sulop, derived from native languages, means "swampy place surrounded by second growth forest" and "habitat of wild pigs."

In the early part of the 19th century, a wave of immigrants from the Visayas Region, mostly from Cebu, came to Sulop. At the time, Sulop was still a barangays under the Municipality of Padada, Davao del Sur. Settlers from Leyte, Iloilo, and Bohol also arrived during the century. They acquired lands from natives peoples known as the Tagacaolo, the B’laans, and the Bagobos, and converted the lands into settlement sites and agricultural production areas.

By virtue of Executive Order No. 295 issued on April 24, 1958, President Carlos P. Garcia converted barangays Sulop and its adjacent barangays into an independent Municipality of Sulop of the Province of Davao del Sur. The development of the municipality underwent eight changes of political leadership up to the present Administration.

President Carlos P Garcia appointed Nestorio Comabig as the first mayor of the Municipality of Sulop. Comabig assigned residential lots to interested parties consistent with the town site development plan. Comabig resigned from office after six years, after which Vice Mayor Antonio Go Pace assumed the vacated mayoral position. He facilitated the construction of the first municipality's Town Hall.

Vice Mayor Sebastian Mondejar, Sr. succeeded the mayorship of Go Pace when the latter died. Mondejar facilitated the coming of Cocoa Investors, Incorporated (CII), a multi-million peso corporation engaged in cacao bean production.

Vice Mayor Perfecto O. Sagarino Sr. succeeded as mayor when Mayor Sebastian Mondejar Sr. was killed in an ambush on December 3, 1982, during the height of insurgency. Sagarino's greatest achievement was the construction of Sulop Public Market Buildings.  He relinquished his position after the EDSA Revolution (People Power Revolution) in 1986;

Atty. Leopoldo C. Diones, Jr. was then installed as OIC-Mayor who retained his position by winning the 1987 and 1992 elections.

Atty. Jose Jimmy S. Sagarino, son of former mayor Perfecto O. Sagarino, emerged the winner in the mayoralty race in 1995 and stayed on for 3 terms. The construction of the new Municipal Government Center of Sulop was made during his incumbency.

On June 30, 2004, local leadership was then steered by Mayor Restituto Ornales. He placed agricultural productivity as the centerpiece of his development thrust and initiated the construction of Labon – Clib Steel Bridge.

The latest change in leadership took place on June 30, 2007, when Mayor Jose Jimmy S. Sagarino was re-elected to his fourth term in office. In his new term, he celebrated the Golden Founding Anniversary of the Municipality of Sulop.

Geography
The municipality is located halfway between two major growth centers of Mindanao, namely, Davao City of Region XI and General Santos of Region XII.

Climate

Barangays
Sulop is politically subdivided into 25 barangays.

Demographics

Economy

Education

The Davao Del Sur State College (DSSC), a campus based in Matti, Digos has a Sulop Extension. Located at Purok 2, Poblacion, Sulop, Davao Del Sur.

References

External links

 Sulop Profile at the DTI Cities and Municipalities Competitive Index
 [ Philippine Standard Geographic Code]
 Philippine Census Information
 Local Governance Performance Management System

Municipalities of Davao del Sur
Establishments by Philippine executive order